Alampur is a small village in Najibabad Tehsil in Bijnor District of Uttar Pradesh State, India. It comes under Kalanpur Buzurg Urf Bahupura Panchayath. It belongs to Moradabad Division. It is located 7 km towards Kiratpur Railway Station and 19 km from the District headquarters, Bijnor. 

Alampur is surrounded by Bahupura, Umari, Sisona and Fazalpur villages.

Villages in Bijnor district